Piz Piot is a mountain of the Oberhalbstein Alps, located between Juf and Casaccia, in the canton of Graubünden.

References

External links
 Piz Piot on Hikr

Mountains of Graubünden
Mountains of the Alps
Alpine three-thousanders
Mountains of Switzerland
Avers
Bregaglia